The Wolf WR7 was a Formula One car built for the 1979 season by the Walter Wolf Racing team. Three examples of the car were produced. The first was WR7. A second car, WR8, was built to the same specification, while a slightly modified car, WR9, first appeared at the British Grand Prix. The cars were driven by 1976 champion James Hunt and Keke Rosberg. The engine was a Ford Cosworth DFV.

Competition history
The car was designed by Harvey Postlethwaite, previously responsible for the Hesketh 308 in which James Hunt won his first race. He was replaced by 1976 champion James Hunt. When it was found that Hunt was unable to fit into the Wolf WR5/6 chassis, a new car had to be built in a haste prior to the season opener in Argentina. The cars proved unreliable and uncompetitive, with Hunt only finishing one of his six races in WR7 and WR8. The assertion made by Motor Sport magazine ahead of the season that Hunt was a driver likely to "quickly lose interest" when not provided with a competitive machine proved right when he left the team to join BBC Television as a commentator after the 1979 Monaco Grand Prix. Keke Rosberg took over his drive for the remainder of the season, but also only finished one race. Rosberg crashed WR9 heavily during qualifying for the Canadian Grand Prix so a hybrid car using WR8's monocoque, dubbed WR8/9 was built up for his use in the United States.

At the end of the 1979 Formula One season, Walter Wolf, owner of the team, pulled out of Formula One and sold the assets of his organisation to Wilson and Emerson Fittipaldi for the use of their Fittipaldi Automotive team. The WR7 cars were raced as Fittipaldi F7s in the early part of the 1980 Formula One season by Emerson Fittipaldi and Rosberg.

Complete Formula One World Championship results
(key) (results in bold indicate pole position; results in italics indicate fastest lap)

References

Wolf Formula One cars